Wartell is a surname. Notable people with the surname include:

Michael A. Wartell (born 1946), American academic administrator
Roger Wartell, American academic
Sarah Rosen Wartell, American non-profit executive

See also
Wartelle